Philip John Palmer (born 9 September 1952) is a British rock sideman and session guitarist who has toured, recorded, and worked with numerous artists. He is best known for his work with Eric Clapton and Dire Straits.

Biography
Palmer grew up in north London. Ray and Dave Davies of The Kinks were his uncles on his mother's side.

Palmer has supported artists that include Lucio Battisti (album Una giornata uggiosa, 1980), Pet Shop Boys, Murray Head, Steve Harley, Wishbone Ash (1986 touring), Joan Armatrading, Eric Clapton, Roger Daltrey, Iggy Pop, Scott Walker (Track Three, 1984), Thomas Anders (1989), Bob Dylan, Tina Turner, Dire Straits (1992 tour), Pete Townshend (1993 and 2000 shows), Eros Ramazzotti (Tutte storie 1993), Alejandro Sanz (Alejandro Sanz 3 1995), Paola e Chiara (1997), Pino Daniele, Geri Halliwell, Katey Sagal, Chris de Burgh, Bryan Adams, Johnny Hallyday, David Knopfler, George Michael, Ivano Fossati, Renato Zero, Claudio Baglioni, Massimo Di Cataldo, Melanie C, Robbie Williams, David Sylvian and Hajime Mizoguchi (album Angels, 2001). He often works with producer Trevor Horn. In 1986, he worked as a studio musician on Alphaville's album Afternoons in Utopia.

He co-wrote "I'm No Angel", recorded separately by Bill Medley and the Gregg Allman Band.

In 1993, Palmer assembled a band called Spin 1ne 2wo, with Paul Carrack (vocals and keyboards), Steve Ferrone (drums), Rupert Hine (producer, keyboards) and Tony Levin (bass). They released one album, a self-titled project, made up of classic rock covers including songs by Jimi Hendrix, The Who, Led Zeppelin, Blind Faith, Steely Dan and Bob Dylan.

Palmer performed with the numerous artists and was the musical director of The Strat Pack, at the 50th anniversary celebration of the Fender Stratocaster guitar which was held in 2004 at Wembley Arena in London. He performed in 2002 as a member of the backing band at the Queen's 50th anniversary rock concert at Buckingham Palace, "Party at the Palace".

To date, he has appeared on over 500 albums and over 5000 songs.

In 2021, Palmer released an autobiography entitled Session Man.

Personal life
His uncles are Ray and Dave Davies of The Kinks. He has appeared with them on stage many times.

He has named Davey Graham and Big Bill Broonzy as key influences on him while growing up.

In January 2012, he married Italian singer and TV personality Numa Palmer. Italian pop megastar Renato Zero was Palmer's best man for the ceremony in Rome. Palmer and his wife are involved in several humanitarian projects, in particular with UNICEF.

Palmer has two children from his first marriage, Oliver and Charlie. His first grandchild was born in 2019.

Appearances
With Iggy Pop
 The Idiot (RCA Records, 1977)

With Take That
 Nobody Else (RCA Records, 1995)

With Murray Head
 Shade (Mercury Records, 1983)
 Restless (Virgin Records, 1984)
 Sooner or Later (Virgin Records, 1987)
 Pipe Dreams (Voiceprint Records, 1995)
 Rien n'est écrit (Sony, 2009)

With Robbie Williams
 Sing When You're Winning (Chrysalis Records, 2000)
 Escapology (EMI, 2002)
 Reality Killed the Video Star (Virgin Records, 2009)

With Juanes
 P.A.R.C.E. (Universal Music, 2010)

With Joan Armatrading
 To the Limit (A&M Records, 1978)
 The Shouting Stage (A&M Records, 1988)

With Seal
 Soul 2 (Reprise Records, 2011)
 7 (Warner Bros. Records, 2015)

With Steve Harley
 The Candidate (EMI, 1979)

With Sheena Easton
 Take My Time (EMI, 1981)
 You Could Have Been with Me (EMI, 1981)
 Madness, Money & Music (EMI, 1982)
 My Cherie (MCA Records, 1995)

With Dire Straits
 On Every Street (Vertigo Records, 1991)

With Ronan Keating
 Songs from Home (Decca Records, 2021)

With Bryan Adams
 18 til I Die (A&M Records, 1996)

With Cliff Richard
 Cliff at Christmas (EMI, 2003)

With Howard Jones
 Dream into Action (Elektra Records, 1985)
 One to One (Elektra Records, 1986)
 Cross That Line (Elektra Records, 1989)

With Duncan James
 Future Past (Innocent Records, 2006)

With Sam Brown
 Stop! (A&M Records, 1988)

With Skin
 Fleshwounds (EMI, 2003)

With John Illsley
 Never Told a Soul (Vertigo Records, 1984)
 Glass (Vertigo Records, 1988)
 Long Shadows (Blue Barge Records, 2016)

With George Michael
 Listen Without Prejudice Vol. 1 (Columbia Records, 1990)
 Songs from the Last Century (Virgin Records, 1999)
 Patience (Epic Records, 2004)

With Delta Goodrem
 Mistaken Identity (Epic Records, 2004)

With David Essex
 Gold & Ivory (CBS Records, 1977)
 Imperial Wizard (Mercury Records, 1979)
 Hot Love (Mercury Records, 1980)
 Silver Dream Racer (Mercury Records, 1980)
 Stage - Struck (Mercury Records, 1982)
 This One's for You (Mercury Records, 1984)

With Nick Lachey
 SoulO (Universal, 2003)

With Eric Clapton
 Journeyman (Reprise Records, 1989)

With Céline Dion
 Unison (Columbia Records, 1990)

With Katey Sagal
 Well... (Virgin Records, 1994)

With Pet Shop Boys
 Fundamental (Parlophone, 2006)

With Alphaville
 Afternoons in Utopia (Atlantic Records, 1986)

With Olly Murs
 Olly Murs (Epic Records, 2010)

With Jim Diamond
 Desire for Freedom (A&M Records, 1986)
 Jim Diamond (Teldec, 1988)

With Jennifer Rush
 Credo (EMI, 1997)

With Thomas Anders
 Different (Teldec, 1989)

With Tina Turner
 Foreign Affair (Capitol Records, 1989)
 Twenty Four Seven (Parlophone Records, 1999)

With Amii Stewart
 Time for Fantasy (RCA Victor, 1988)

With Andrew Ridgeley
 Son of Albert (Columbia Records, 1990)

With Tasmin Archer
 Great Expectations (Capitol Records, 1992)

With Jimmy Nail
 Crocodile Shoes (East West Records, 1994)
 Crocodile Shoes II (East West Records, 1996)

With Gary Barlow
 Open Road (RCA Records, 1997)
 Twelve Months, Eleven Days (RCA Records, 1999)

With Lulu
 Together (Mercury Records, 2002)

With Judie Tzuke
 Left Hand Talking (Columbia Records, 1991)

With Melanie C
 Reason (Virgin Records, 2003)

With Lisa Stansfield
 The Moment (Edel, 2004)

With Geri Halliwell
 Passion (EMI, 2005)

References

External links

Phil Palmer Official Website
Wishbone Ash personnel

VibeMusic.com
Phil Palmer Appears On Discography
Interview with Phil Palmer, Apr 2009
MasterClass & Concert in Niort (F)
One of the world top session guitarists

1952 births
Living people
English rock guitarists
English blues guitarists
English jazz guitarists
English male guitarists
Musicians from London
Slide guitarists
English session musicians